Vipera (commonly known as the palaearctic vipers and Eurasian vipers) is a genus of vipers. It has a very wide range, being found from North Africa to just within the Arctic Circle and from Great Britain to Pacific Asia. The Latin name vīpera is possibly derived from the Latin words vivus and pario, meaning "alive" and "bear" or "bring forth"; likely a reference to the fact that most vipers bear live young. Currently, 21 species are recognized. Like all other vipers, the members of this genus are venomous.

Description
The members of this genus tend to be stout and small in size, the largest of them, V. ammodytes, can reach a maximum length of 95 cm and the smallest, V. monticola, reaches a maximum length of 40 cm.
The heads of the members of this genus are clearly separated from the body, they are triangular in shape and in most species are covered in small scales, although in some species, notably V. berus, have small plates on the top of their heads.  Most species have large supraocular scales that tend to extend beyond the posterior margin of the eye. Some species also have some sort of horn on the head, either right behind the nasal scale, or behind the supraocular scales.
The color scheme and camouflage of the members of this genus vary widely, from a grayish ground color with dark brown transverse bands to browner colors with grey transverse bands edged with black in the case of V. ammodytes.Geographic range
They can be found all around the Old World, hence the common name of the genus, "Old World vipers". they can be found most notably in Europe, from Portugal to Turkey. They can also be found on some islands in the Mediterranean Sea (Sicily, Elba and Montecristo), and the United Kingdom. They can also be found in the Maghreb region of Africa with species living in Morocco (V. monticola) and northern parts of Algeria and Tunisia in the case of V. latastei. Many species can also be found in the Caucasus mountains, parts of Iraq, Jordan, Israel and Syria. Only one species (V. berus) discovered so far lives in East Asia, most notably North Korea, northern China and northern Mongolia.

Habitat
Most species prefer cooler environments. Those found at lower latitudes tend to prefer higher altitudes and dryer, rocky habitats, while the species that occur at more northern latitudes prefer lower elevations and environments that have more vegetation and moisture.

Behavior
All species are terrestrial.

Reproduction
All members are viviparous, giving birth to live young.

Venom
Most Vipera species have venom that contains both neurotoxic and haemotoxic components. Bites vary widely in severity.
V. ammodytes is most likely the one with the most toxic venom. In a study solely involving mice, Brown (1973) shows that the LD50 is about 1.2/mg/kg through an IV, 1.5 mg/Kg when injected in the peritoneum (IP) and 2.0 mg/kg when administered subcutaneously.
V. berus venom is considered to be on the lower end of the scale when it comes to toxicity, (Minton, 1974) suggests that the LD50 values for mice are about 0.55 mg/kg IV, 0.80 mg/kg IP and 6.45 mg SC. Venom yield tends to be lower in this species with Minton citing 10–18 mg per bite in specimens 48–62 cm while Brown suggest only 6 mg for the same sized specimens.
However, bites from Vipera species are rarely as severe as those from larger Macrovipera or Daboia.

Fossil record
The oldest species of this genus is the Early Miocene Vipera antiqua from Southern Germany. The earliest known Vipera antiqua fossil has been dated to 22.5 million years ago. A very large indeterminate Vipera was found in the Early Pliocene deposits of Mallorca.

Species

* Not including the nominate subspecies.
T: type species

References

Further reading
Arnold EN, Burton JA (1978). A Field Guide to the Reptiles and Amphibians of Britain and Europe. London: Collins. 272 pp. . (Genus Vipera, pp. 211, 214).
Boulenger GA (1896). Catalogue of the Snakes in the British Museum (Natural History). Volume II., Containing the ... Viperidæ. London: Trustees of the British Museum (Natural History). (Taylor and Francis, printers). xiv + 727 pp. + Plates I-XXV. (Genus Vipera, pp. 471–472.)
Laurenti JN (1768). Specimen medicum, exhibens synopsin reptilium emendatam cum experimentis circa venena et antidota reptilium austriacorum. Vienna: Joan. Thom. Nob. de Trattnern. 214 pp. + Plates I-V. (Genus Vipera, p. 99). (in Latin).

External links

 

 
Snake genera
Taxa named by Josephus Nicolaus Laurenti